Oleg Sîrghi (born 9 July 1987 in Krasnoyarsk) is a Moldovan weightlifter. He won two gold medals at the European Championships from weightlifting Kazan (2011) and Tirana (2013), as well as a silver medal at the European weightlifting Championships at Antalya (2012), the weight category under 56 kg.

Oleg Sîrghi was named athlete of the year 2013 in Moldova by the Ministry of youth and sports.

Oleg was born in Krasnoyarsk but moved to live in Moldova. He started to practic weightlifting at the age of 10 years old and participates at international competitions since 14 years old. He tried several types of sport, but chose weightlifting because of his father, who is also a professional in the field.

References

External links 
 

1987 births
Living people
Moldovan male weightlifters
European Weightlifting Championships medalists
Universiade medalists in weightlifting
Universiade bronze medalists for Moldova
Medalists at the 2013 Summer Universiade
Sportspeople from Krasnoyarsk
20th-century Moldovan people
21st-century Moldovan people